Cerithiopsis infrequens is a species of sea snail, a gastropod in the family Cerithiopsidae. It was described by Rolán, Espinosa, and Fernández-Garcés, in 2007.

References

infrequens
Gastropods described in 2007